Walter Thomas Wardle (born Southsea 22 July 1900; died 12 February 1982) was Archdeacon of Gloucester from 1949 until his death.

Wardle was educated at Pembroke College, Oxford; and Ripon College Cuddesdon. He was ordained Deacon in 1926; and Priest in 1927. After a curacy at Weeke he was an SPG Chaplain at Montana, Switzerland He was Rector of Wolferton with Babingley from 1929 to 1938; Vicar of Great Barrington and Little Barrington with Taynton, 1938 to 1943; and Vicar of Charlton Kings from 1943 o 1948 when he became a Canon Residentiary at Gloucester Cathedral, a post he held for the rest of his life.

Wardle was a Freemason, and a member of the Apollo University Lodge, Oxford, under the United Grand Lodge of England.

References

1900 births
People from Southsea
Alumni of Pembroke College, Oxford
Alumni of Ripon College Cuddesdon
Archdeacons of Gloucester
1982 deaths